Paul Nicholas Miller (born August 11, 1988), better known by his online alias GypsyCrusader, is an American far-right political commentator, streamer, white supremacist, former Muay Thai fighter and convicted felon. He is best known for his livestreams on various media services that feature him cosplaying as an array of different characters including the Joker, the Riddler, Mario, and others while he tells his political beliefs to strangers on Omegle. He is known for his advocacy for a race war and espousing white supremacy and neo-Nazism. He has been tied to multiple alt-right and far-right organizations, including the Proud Boys and the Boogaloo movement.

Early life 
Paul Nicholas Miller was born in New York on August 11, 1988. His father is of Romani descent and his mother is Mexican.

Fighting career 
Miller began training in Muay Thai in 2008, at the age of 20. He had his first amateur fight in 2008 after only 3 months of training. He trained with the 9 Weapons Muay Thai and later The Institute. He became the Regional Light-Heavyweight Champion and the US National Champion in the World Kickboxing Association.  He then became a trainer and coach, including for The Institute.

Views and online activity 
Miller identifies as a "radical conservative" and has been known for his openly alt-right political views. He often expresses his hatred towards racial minorities and heavily opposes immigration. Miller also calls for a "race war" and is a conspiracy theorist who supports the "Day of the Rope", a white supremacist slogan that references William Luther Pierce's book The Turner Diaries. In the novel, white supremacists take control of California and engage in mass lynchings of anyone perceived as a "race traitor"; these include journalists, politicians, and white people in interracial relationships. The day on which these murders are committed in the novel is referred to as the "Day of the Rope". Many white supremacists and neo-Nazis, including Miller, believe that the "Day of the Rope" will one day become reality.

Minorities 
Miller often shows extreme hatred towards Jews and has frequently denied the Holocaust. He has expressed a desire to "gas them" and claims he is "building an army" online with the intent of carrying out his violent ideas. In several videos that he published online, he can be seen posing next to Nazi flags and wearing armor brandishing swastikas.

An open white supremacist, Miller is also known for his hatred of black people. Due to his belief that they should be "sent back to Africa", he has been described as being a white nationalist. He has also used the phrase "only white lives matter" and has antagonized multiple Black Lives Matter protesters at several different protests.

George Floyd protests 
In 2020, Miller stated that nobody has a right to protest the murder of George Floyd. He was also connected to the Boogaloo movement and allegedly wore a Boogaloo mask during a protest on May 31, 2020.

Miller attended a Trump rally and told a black woman with a sign that said "Black Lives Matter" that "only white lives matter" and "Heil Hitler" before calling another black woman a "chimp". Later that day, Miller drove by a Black Lives Matter rally in East Brunswick, New Jersey and yelled "Nigger lives don't matter" several times at protesters.

In 2021, Miller and an unidentified man recorded themselves threatening a black man. Miller told the man to "Get the fuck out of here" and said that he and his friend will "kick [his] ass". He also referred to the man as a "nigger" multiple times and told the man he was in the "wrong neighborhood".

Online activity 
Miller is well-known for his online presence. He often dresses up as various different characters and talks to strangers on online chat website Omegle where he discusses his political views with the intent of disturbing or angering whomever he is talking to for shock value. He has streamed content using the platforms DLive, Twitch, bitwave.tv, and reuploaded to BitChute. He was also active on Telegram where he has over 40,000 followers.

He has been banned on most social media platforms including Instagram, Twitter, YouTube, Twitch, DLive, and Facebook.

He has been characterized for his racist remarks and inappropriate behavior online. He is also known for his affiliations with fellow white supremacists and internet personalities Tor Brookes (better known online as CatboyKami) and Brandon Martinez, although he later had a falling out with Brookes.

Legal issues

Assault and drug possession charges 
In 2006, at the age of 18, Miller was charged with aggravated assault. He pled not guilty and was not sentenced to jail time.

In 2007, Miller was arrested and charged with possession of drugs and intent to sell. He served 180 days in jail and 4 years of probation.

Gun possession charge 
On January 17, 2018, Miller was charged with illegally possessing a gun. He was indicted on the charge on February 25, 2021 and the charge later led to him being raided in 2021.

Antifa incident and fallout 
On October 12, 2018, Miller was involved in an altercation with Antifa protestors. Miller alleges he was trying to attend a speech given by Proud Boys founder Gavin McInnes in order to report on it. The incident took place outside of the Metropolitan Republican Club in New York. Miller also reported that his backpack was stolen during the altercation. The police unsuccessfully searched for the person who stole Miller's backpack. Miller later stated "they tried to kill me" in reference to the altercation and called the attackers "terrorists". 20-year old Finbarr Slonim, 20-year old Kai Russo, and 35-year old Caleb Perkins were arrested and charged in connection with the assault.

Following the incident, Miller claimed he had an "awakening" and became "woke". He was allegedly frequently doxed and bombarded with death threats from people he claims are affiliated with Antifa following their attack on him. He has also claimed that person's affiliated with Antifa threatened to burn down his parents' house. His story quickly gained traction on the internet and Miller claims he lost his job and as a result moved to Florida.

2020 FBI visit 
On May 21, 2020, FBI agents showed up at Miller's parents' home and tried to reach him. It was revealed that they were sent after him regarding anti-protest statements he had made online and his proposal of an open-carry rally. Once they deemed he was not a threat, no further action was taken.

Atomwaffen Division harassment 
In 2021, Miller was targeted by a member of the neo-Nazi organization Atomwaffen Division. It is alleged that Miller was targeted for giving neo-Nazis and white supremacists a "bad rep". The attacker recorded videos threatening Miller that were allegedly taken outside of Miller's home in Florida. He also ordered takeout consistently and had it delivered to Miller's home and DDoSed Miller so that he couldn't stream. Multiple cabs were also sent to Miller's address to pick him up.

On January 30, police received numerous calls relating to a suspect allegedly breaking into Miller's home although they were unable to locate the suspect upon arriving at the scene. They were continuously called regarding the alleged robbery upon leaving the scene. Miller later chose to leave his complex for a "little while" in hopes of allowing the situation to die down and to protect his neighbors.

2021 FBI raid and firearm charge 
On March 2, 2021 Miller was arrested on three different charges. According to reports, flashbangs went off during a raid of Miller's home in Fort Lauderdale, which took place at around 5 in the morning. The arrest stemmed from an incident that took place on January 17, 2018 in which Miller illegally possessed a gun. On February 25, 2021, he was indicted on the January 2018 charge. His first hearing took place on March 3. He offered up an apology during the hearing saying "I'm really sorry for all of this. I really am." He also told the judge that he has enough money to hire his own attorney and has reportedly reached out to Mark O'Mara, the attorney who worked for George Zimmerman. He later hired free speech activist and attorney Norman Kent. On March 10, during his bond trial, he was denied bail and was to remain incarcerated while on trial. On June 22, 2021, Miller pleaded guilty to one count each of possession of a firearm, possession of ammunition and possession of an unregistered firearm. On September 28, Miller was sentenced to 41 months' imprisonment followed by three years' supervised release.

On January 31, 2023, he was released from prison on good behavior and with supervised release.

Notes

References 

Living people
Alt-right
American neo-Nazis
American Muay Thai practitioners
American people of Mexican descent
American people of Romani descent
Critics of Black Lives Matter
YouTube controversies
Alt-right activists
1988 births
American political commentators
Cosplayers
American YouTubers
Anti-immigration activists
Criminals from New York (state)
American conspiracy theorists
American people convicted of drug offenses
People convicted of illegal possession of weapons